The Cabinet of the United Arab Emirates, or Council of Ministers, is the chief executive body of the United Arab Emirates (UAE) federal government. The Cabinet consists of federal government ministers, and is led by the Prime Minister of the United Arab Emirates. Although not stated in the Constitution of the United Arab Emirates, the position of Prime Minister is nominally held by the Ruler of Dubai. The Cabinet reports to the President of the United Arab Emirates and the Federal Supreme Council.

History
The first cabinet was formed following the union of UAE as a federation on 9 December 1971. 

The last reshuffle was on 20 October 2017 which was the first reshuffle since 2013.

The heads of four ministries were changed in the reshuffle: Ministry of Public Works, Ministry of Energy and two state ministries. Abdul Rahman bin Mohammed Al Owais, acting health minister and minister of culture, youth and community development, became health minister in the same reshuffle. Hamdan bin Mubarak Al Nahyan, public works minister, was appointed minister of higher education and scientific research. He replaced Nahyan bin Mubarak Al Nahyan, who was appointed minister of culture, youth and community development.

Jurisdiction 
The Cabinet runs and represents the federal government of the United Arab Emirates and jurisdiction varies among the Emirates of the United Arab Emirates, with some emirates such as the Government of Dubai retaining broad jurisdiction over legislative, judicial and security affairs. The main jurisdiction of the Cabinet lies with standardising laws and coordination between the various Emirates, in addition to exclusive jurisdiction over defence and foreign affairs, among others.

Members of the Cabinet

References

External links
 

United Arab Emirates
Government of the United Arab Emirates